Nicolette Krebitz is a German director, actress, model, and singer. She is often credited as Coco in her creative works.

Life and work

Nicolette Krebitz made her film debut at age eleven. Later, she hosted television and radio shows for children and attended the Ballett-Centre Berlin and the Fritz-Kirchhoff acting school, also in Berlin.

Krebitz has appeared in over 30 movies, but she is known best for her role in the German-language films Bandits (1997) and Der Tunnel (2001). She also appeared in the English-language film All the Queen's Men (2001). She wrote and directed the 2001 movie Jeans and 2007's .

She is the model on the cover of New Order's 2001 album Get Ready and its associated singles. Her image is also on the cover and in the sleeve of Terranova's 1999 album Close the Door. She contributed vocals to the Bandits soundtrack and to the Terranova tracks Just Enough, Plastic Stress and Never.

Tribute
The German hip hop group Fettes Brot together with Indie band Tocotronic has dedicated a song to her entitled "Nicolette Krebitz wartet" ("Nicolette Krebitz is Waiting") which is a cover version of the Bananarama hit "Robert De Niro's Waiting...".

Awards

1997 Bavarian Film Award, Best Film Score

Selected filmography

References

External links
 
 Fan site in German

German film actresses
German female models
Year of birth missing (living people)
Living people
Actresses from Berlin
20th-century German actresses
21st-century German actresses
Models from Berlin